The Grid is an English electronic dance group, consisting of David Ball (formerly of Soft Cell) and Richard Norris, with guest contributions from other musicians. They are best known for the hits "Swamp Thing", "Texas Cowboys", "Crystal Clear", "Rollercoaster" and "Floatation".

Band members
 Richard Norris – keyboards, drum programming
 David Ball – keyboards, programming
 Sacha Rebecca Souter – vocals

History
The Grid formed in 1988, after both Ball and Norris had worked with Psychic TV on the Jack the Tab – Acid Tablets Volume One album. They recorded the track "Meet Every Situation Head On" together as "M.E.S.H.". The Grid had their first success with their debut single, "Floatation", released on East West Records in 1990. They went on to release a string of ten UK hit singles and four albums, and toured the UK, Europe, Asia and Australia. The group's 1994 album Evolver reached No. 14 in the UK Albums Chart. The lead single from this album, "Swamp Thing", features elaborate banjo lines played by Roger Dinsdale. "Swamp Thing" proved to be a commercial success in the UK, Europe and Australia, reaching No. 3 in the UK and Australia, and selling a total of one million copies.

In 1996, Norris and Ball agreed to a hiatus in order pursue individual music interests. Norris formed The Droyds, who went on to remix tracks by musicians including Armand Van Helden and Siobhan Fahey, and wrote the official biography of Paul Oakenfold, published in 2007. Ball reformed Soft Cell with Marc Almond, and also wrote music scores for films. Norris has since formed the psychedelic duo, Beyond The Wizard's Sleeve, with DJ Erol Alkan, and has released a number of solo records and remixes under the name The Time and Space Machine.

The duo reunited in 2005, initially playing two gigs under the name GDM with female singer Misty Woods, before writing and recording new material as The Grid. A single, "Put Your Hands Together", was released in 2007 and an album, Doppelgänger, followed in 2008. Both were released on the Some Bizzare label. The album featured vocals by the British musician, Chris Braide.

In 2018, during the second reunion of Soft Cell, Ball and Norris released a new album as the Grid, One Way Traffic, which was recorded as part of Moog Music Inc.'s "The Moog Sound Lab" program, using Moog modular synthesizers.

Discography

Albums

Singles

References

Further reading

External links
The Grid official Facebook page
Grid Central – unofficial page
[ The Grid at AllMusic]
The Grid Myspace

English dance music groups
English electronic music duos
English house music groups
English techno music groups
Remixers
East West Records artists
Some Bizzare Records artists
Virgin Records artists
Male musical duos
Electronic dance music duos